Constellation is an upcoming psychological thriller television series created by Peter Harness.

Premise
A woman who has returned to Earth upon a disaster during her mission finds parts of her life seemingly missing.

Cast
 Noomi Rapace as Jo
 Jonathan Banks as Henry
 James D'Arcy as Magnus

Production
It was announced in April 2022 that Apple TV+ had greenlit the series, created by Peter Harness, for a series order. Noomi Rapace and Jonathan Banks were announced to star with Michelle MacLaren directing. The next month, James D'Arcy would join the cast, Oliver Hirschbiegel and Joseph Cedar were announced as directors of episodes for the series alongside MacLaren.

Filming for the series began by September 2022 in Berlin. The series was also filmed in the municipality of Inari in Finnish Lapland in the winter of 2023.

References

External links
 

Apple TV+ original programming
Upcoming television series
Television shows filmed in Germany
Television shows filmed in Finland